Eukaryotic translation initiation factor 3 subunit J (eIF3j) is a protein that in humans is encoded by the EIF3J gene.

Interactions 

eIF3j has been shown to interact with eIF3a.

See also 
Eukaryotic initiation factor 3 (eIF3)

References

Further reading

External links